São João is a neighbourhood (bairro) in the city of Porto Alegre, the state capital of Rio Grande do Sul, in Brazil. It was created by Law 2022 from December 7, 1959.

The Salgado Filho International Airport is located here.

In 2000, there were 13,238 people living in São João.

External links
 Porto Alegre City Homepage

Neighbourhoods in Porto Alegre